Kern & Sohn is a German manufacturer and distributor of precision scales and force gauges. It was founded in 1844 in Albstadt, Ebingen by Gottlieb Kern and its products are often referenced in nineteenth century international scientific publications.

The business is currently run by the sixth generation of the Kern family, and is one of only two German companies from that period to remain family-owned throughout its history (along with Bizerba). Many of the scales and balances produced by Kern are exhibited at the Waagenmuseum in Balingen. It has 100 employees.

History 
Gottlieb Kern belonged to a family of European artists and stonemasons. Kern & Sohn started in the midst of a recession but by 1867, the company was producing and selling around 2,000 balances a year to scientists, apothecaries, chemists and goldsmiths. In 1870, Albert Sauter, the step-son of Kern, joined the Kern & Sohn Board of Directors.

During the last quarter of the nineteenth century, Kern & Sohn introduced innovations and modifications into their designs to increase accuracy. In 1886, Gottlieb Kern died and Sauter became President of the company. The period was marked with expansion and technological development. By the turn of the century, Kern & Sohn held a dominant market position in a number of weight measurement fields. In 1903, Albert Sauter's son Gustav took over the company.

Products 
Kern & Sohn deals in a variety of scale products, including scales (both industrial and medical), laboratory balances, software, stroboscopes, length, force and torque measurement, coating thickness and material thickness.

Distributors 
Kern sells directly to end-users of precision scales and force gauges as well as distributors throughout the world.

References 

Manufacturing companies of Germany